Squamanotoxus is a genus of monoceros beetles in the family Anthicidae. There are at least three described species in Squamanotoxus.

Species
These three species belong to the genus Squamanotoxus:
 Squamanotoxus balsasensis (Werner, 1962)
 Squamanotoxus elegans (LeConte, 1875)
 Squamanotoxus vafer (Chandler, 1977)

References

Further reading

 
 

Anthicidae
Articles created by Qbugbot